

The CARMAM 15-38 was a French sailplane built in the late 1970s. It utilised the wing design of the CARMAM Aiglon but had an all-new fuselage. Like the Aiglon, this was of fibreglass construction throughout. The 15-38 was easily distinguished from its predecessor by a more streamlined nose and a T-tail.

Specifications

References

See also

1970s French sailplanes
Glider aircraft
Aircraft first flown in 1979
T-tail aircraft